Nu ("Watery One") or Nun ("The Inert One"), is the personification of the primordial watery abyss which existed at the time of creation and from which the creator sun god Ra arose, in ancient Egyptian religion. Nu is one of the eight deities of the Ogdoad representing ancient Egyptian primordial Chaos from which the primordial mound arose from. Nun can be seen as the first of all the gods and the creator of reality and personification of the cosmos. Nun is also considered the god that will destroy existence and return everything to the Nun from whence it came. No cult was addressed to Nun.

The consort of Nun was the goddess Nunut or Naunet.

Name
The name on Nu is paralleled with  "inactivity" in a play of words in, "I raised them up from out of the watery mass [], out of inactivity []". The name has also been compared to the Coptic noun "abyss; deep".

Origin myth

The ancient Egyptians envisaged the oceanic abyss of the Nun as surrounding a bubble in which the sphere of life is encapsulated, representing the deepest mystery of their cosmogony. In ancient Egyptian creation accounts, the original mound of land comes forth from the waters of the Nun. The Nun is the source of all that appears in a differentiated world, encompassing all aspects of divine and earthly existence. In the Ennead cosmogony, Nun is perceived as transcendent at the point of creation alongside Atum the creator god.

Creation myth 

In the beginning the universe only consisted of a great chaotic cosmic ocean, and the ocean itself was referred to as Nu. At the beginning of time Mehet-Weret, portrayed as a cow with a sun disk between her horns, gives birth to the sun, said to have risen from the waters of creation and to have given birth to the sun god Ra in some myths. The universe was enrapt by a vast mass of primordial waters, and the Benben, a pyramid mound, emerged amid this primal chaos. There was a blue Lotus flower with Benben, and this when it blossomed brought Ra.

History
Beginning with the Middle Kingdom, Nun is described as "the father of the gods" and he is depicted on temple walls throughout the rest of ancient Egyptian religious history.

The Ogdoad includes along with Naunet and Nun, Amaunet and Amun; Hauhet and Heh; and Kauket and Kek. Like the other Ogdoad deities, Nu did not have temples or any center of worship. Even so, Nu was sometimes represented by a sacred lake, or, as at Abydos, by an underground stream.

Iconography 

Nun was depicted as an anthropomorphic large figure and a personification of the primordial waters, with water ripples filling the body, holding a notched palm branch. Nun was also depicted in anthropomorphic form but with the head of a frog, and he was typically depicted in ancient Egyptian art holding aloft the solar barque or the sun disc. He may appear greeting the rising sun in the guise of a baboon. Nun is otherwise symbolized by the presence of a sacred cistern or lake as in the sanctuaries of Karnak and Dendara.
Nu was shown usually as male but also had aspects that could be represented as female or male. Naunet (also spelt Nunet) is the female aspect, which is the name Nu with a female gender ending. The male aspect, Nun, is written with a male gender ending. As with the primordial concepts of the Ogdoad, Nu's male aspect was depicted as a frog, or a frog-headed man. In Ancient Egyptian art, Nun also appears as a bearded man, with blue-green skin, representing water. Naunet is represented as a snake or snake-headed woman.

In the 12th Hour of the Book of Gates, Nu is depicted with upraised arms holding a solar bark (or barque, a boat). The boat is occupied by eight deities with the scarab deity Khepri standing in the middle surrounded by the seven other deities.

During the Late Period when Egypt was occupied by foreign powers, the negative aspect of the Nun (chaos) became the dominant perception, reflecting the forces of disorder that were set loose in the country.

See also

References

Further reading
 E. A. Wallis Budge, The Gods of the Egyptians: Or, Studies in Egyptian Mythology (1904), vol. 1, 283f.

Chaos (cosmogony)
Egyptian gods
Personifications
Water gods